Imran Niazi (born November 17, 1986) is a Pakistani retired footballer who played as a winger for Afghan Chaman and WAPDA, notably winning Pakistan Premier League three times with the latter team.

Niazi began his career at Chaman's Afghan Chaman. After the conclusion of re-branded Pakistan Premier League, he joined five times national champions WAPDA. Niazi won three Pakistan Premier League titles with WAPDA, winning the leagues in 2007–08, 2008–09 and 2010–11.

Honours
WAPDA
Pakistan Premier League: 2007–08, 2008–09, 2010–11

References

Living people
Pashtun people
1986 births
Footballers at the 2006 Asian Games
Pakistani footballers
Pakistan international footballers
Association football midfielders
Asian Games competitors for Pakistan
South Asian Games gold medalists for Pakistan
South Asian Games medalists in football